Aloe sect. Lomatophyllum is a taxonomic section within the genus Aloe, comprising between 12 and 18 closely related species of Aloe from Madagascar and the Mascareigne islands.

These species are distinguished by their having fleshy berries of unwinged seeds (unlike the other Aloe species which bear dehiscent capsules of winged seeds).

Description
The Aloes of this section are all shrubby and form short stems, topped with succulent lanceolate leaves. The flowers appear in racemes and range in colour from orange or yellow to red. The plants produce fleshy berries which contain the seeds.

Distribution
The species of this section are all located on the islands of the Indian Ocean. Most are restricted to the island of Madagascar. A minority are indigenous to the smaller islands of Reunion, Mauritius, Rodrigues, Aldabra and Pemba. These form a clade that likely radiated from Madagascar following the roots of the major ocean currents. Most of the species of the smaller Indian Ocean islands grow on beaches or very near to the coast. In some parts of their distribution, they are locally known as "Mazambrons".

Species
 Aloe aldabrensis (Marais) - indigenous to West Island, Aldabra Atoll, Seychelles. 
 Aloe citrea (Guillaumin) - Madagascar
 Aloe lomatophylloides (Balf.f.) - endemic to the island of Rodrigues.
 Aloe purpurea (Lamark) - endemic to the island of Mauritius. 
 Aloe tormentorii (Marais) - endemic to the island of Mauritius. 
 Aloe macra (Haworth) - endemic to the island of Réunion. 
 Aloe mayottensis (Berger) - Comoros islands
 Aloe alexandrei (Ellert) - Comoros islands
 Aloe namorokaensis (Rauh.) - Madagascar
 Aloe occidentalis (H.Perr.) - Western half of Madagascar
 Aloe oligophylla (Baker) - Madagascar
 Aloe orientalis (H.Perr.) - Eastern half of Madagascar
 Aloe pembana (Newton) - Pemba Island
 Aloe propagulifera (Rauh) - Madagascar
 Aloe prostrata (Perrier) - Madagascar
 Aloe rosea (Perrier) - Madagascar 
 Aloe sakarahensis (Lavranos) - Madagascar
 Aloe socialis (Perrier) - Madagascar
 Aloe viviparum (Perrier) - Madagascar

Comparative species gallery

References

Lomatophyllum
Plant sections